Ramona the Pest, by Beverly Cleary, is the second book of the Ramona series and the first to focus on Ramona Quimby as the protagonist.  This children's book chronicles the adventures of Ramona's first few months at kindergarten. The book's title is derived from the characterization of Ramona as a "pest" by many, including her older sister Beatrice, known as "Beezus." Ramona the Pest was first published in 1968 and featured illustrations by Louis Darling.  Other illustrators have since updated Ramona the Pest, including Alan Tiegreen, Tracy Dockray, and Jacqueline Rogers.

Plot summary
Ramona Quimby is excited because she is starting kindergarten. She is a year older than in Beezus and Ramona and trouble still seems to follow her.  Although Ramona does not mean to be a pest, she still manages to create trouble without trying to. Miss Binney is her teacher, and Ramona likes her a lot, especially when she praises Ramona's interesting drawing and nice fat letter 'Q's. There's a girl in her class named Susan with long, springy curls. Ramona really wants to pull on one of those curls and watch it bounce back and forth, but when she finally does she gets sent to the bench until recess is over. Another new person in her class is Davy. Ramona chases him at recess, trying to catch and kiss him, which she finally manages to accomplish when she participates in the Halloween parade when she is "the baddest witch in the world."

Ramona tries to do her best in kindergarten but it isn't easy, especially during seat work, when she has to sit quietly and keep her eyes on her own work. She's just too interested in seeing what everyone else is doing. Still, kindergarten is going well until the day the substitute teacher arrives. Ramona won't go to class without Miss Binney, so she hides behind the trash cans with Ribsy the dog. When Beezus finds her and takes her to the principal's office Ramona is forced to go to class anyway.

Then one day, Susan calls Ramona a "pest", Ramona retaliates by pulling Susan's curls, and Miss Binney sends her home until she can behave. Ramona decides that Miss Binney doesn't like her any more, and she refuses to go back. Nothing anyone says to her can change her mind until she gets a letter from Miss Binney returning the tooth she lost at school the day she was suspended and Ramona decides Miss Binney must like her and is happy to return to kindergarten.

Critical reception
Kirkus Reviews praised the book. "Ramona's going to school. . . who needs a review? … The conjunction of belly laugh and basal emotion puts this on a par with the best in the series." Common Sense Media writes that "the sparkling writing style and humorous story line are both engaging and highly appealing." Choosing Books for Kids says that in Ramona the Pest "Cleary rings true and touches sixes and sevens feelings and funny bones." It includes the book on its list of Ten Books Every Six- and Seven-Year-Old Should Know.

Other reviewers noted that the appeal of the book is not limited any particular age group. "Ramona's determination to be chosen as the wake-up fairy at nap time on her first day of kindergarten… contains levels of humour for older children, from the faintly ludicrous physical situation through to the ironic implications as to what is going on in Ramona's mind; and it brings a smile to the face of all those teachers who have encountered a Ramona." Recommending the book for beginning readers, Great Books for Girls calls it, "A popular read-aloud for younger children, too." Reviewer Anita Silvey praises Cleary's ability to write books "that can be enjoyed by even the youngest readers yet are so sharply observed that readers of all ages respond to the material." And according to author and children's book reviewer Rob Reid, "Her year in kindergarten makes one of the funniest books on the market."

In 2012 it was ranked number 24 on a list of the top 100 children's novels published by School Library Journal.

Editions

Audio Formats: Ramona the Pest is available in cassette, CD and eAudiobook from HarperCollins Audio, 2010; Audiobook on CD from Princeton, N.J.: Recording for the Blind & Dyslexic, 2008.

Print/English: Large print books through American Printing House for the Blind, braille editions available at Seedlings Braille Books for Children, and e-Books through HarperCollins e-books.

Print/Worldwide: As of 2010, 140 editions of Ramona the Pest had been published in 9 languages.

See also

References

External links
The World of Beverly Cleary

1968 American novels
American children's novels
Novels by Beverly Cleary
Novels set in Portland, Oregon
1968 children's books